Alexander Ulrich (born 11 February 1971) is a German politician. Born in Kusel, Rhineland-Palatinate, he represents The Left. Alexander Ulrich has served as a member of the Bundestag from the state of Rhineland-Palatinate since 2005.

Life 
After attending secondary school, Ulrich began training as a toolmaker in 1987, which he completed in 1990. Afterwards he worked in his learned profession at Opel AG, where he was released from work as a member of the works council from 1994 to 1998. In 1998, he moved to IG Metall Kaiserslautern as the 2nd authorized representative and managing director. He became member of the bundestag after the 2005 German federal election. He is a member of the Committee on Economic and Energy Affairs and the Committee on European Union Affairs.

References

External links 

  
 Bundestag biography 

1971 births
Living people
Members of the Bundestag for Rhineland-Palatinate
Members of the Bundestag 2021–2025
Members of the Bundestag 2017–2021
Members of the Bundestag 2013–2017
Members of the Bundestag 2009–2013
Members of the Bundestag 2005–2009
Members of the Bundestag for The Left